During the 623-year existence of the Ottoman Empire, there were many rebellions. Some of these rebellions were in fact interregnum (such as Cem’s rebellion). Some were national uprisings (such as Greek War of Independence). In the list below only those rebellions confined to Turkey, the heartland of Ottoman Empire are shown.

List
Note: Most of the rebellions are here named after their leader.

Rebellions against the Ottoman Empire
Rebellions